John Hamilton Stirling (1887–1924) was a Scottish footballer who played in the Football League for Bradford Park Avenue, Coventry City, Middlesbrough and Stoke.

Career
Stirling was born in Clydebank and played for both local side Clydebank Juniors and then for Clyde (where he featured on the losing side in the 1910 Scottish Cup Final) before moving to England with Middlesbrough in 1911. He spent three seasons with the Ayresome Park club under the management of Thomas McIntosh the side finished in 3rd position in the First Division during the 1913–14 season. Stirling left for Bradford Park Avenue where he spent the 1914–15 season before football was halted due to the outbreak of World War I.

After the end of the war Stirling joined Stoke who had just re-gained their Football League status after falling foul of financial mismanagement. He played in 21 matches for Stoke, scoring once against Stockport County in October 1919. He left for Coventry City in March 1920 and played five matches for the Sky Blues before returning to Scotland with Dunfermline Athletic (then playing in the Central League) and Alloa Athletic.

At representative level, he played in the Home Scots v Anglo-Scots annual trial matches in 1912 and 1914 while with Middlesbrough, but never gained a full cap for Scotland. He also played in two editions of the Glasgow FA's annual challenge match against Sheffield while with Clyde.

Career statistics
Source:

References

Scottish footballers
Sportspeople from Clydebank
Footballers from West Dunbartonshire
Bradford (Park Avenue) A.F.C. players
Coventry City F.C. players
Stoke City F.C. players
Middlesbrough F.C. players
English Football League players
1887 births
1924 deaths
Clyde F.C. players
Third Lanark A.C. players
Clydebank Juniors F.C. players
Dunfermline Athletic F.C. players
Alloa Athletic F.C. players
Association football outside forwards
Scottish Football League players
Scottish Junior Football Association players